Armenia participated at the 2017 Summer Universiade in Taipei, Taiwan with 16 competitors in 7 sport.

Diving

Fencing

Gymnastics

Judo

Taekwondo

Weightlifting

Wushu

References

Nations at the 2017 Summer Universiade